We Didn't Say That! is the debut album by American teen pop duo Daphne and Celeste, released in the summer of 2000. It received mixed reviews from the press, with Dean Carlson of AllMusic and Melody Maker  giving it four out of five stars, and NME giving it five out of ten stars.

Besides its three singles, tracks on the album include "Peek-a-Boo" (a song describing a party for otherworldly creatures at Amityville that the girls crash and find a ghost, a boogieman, a wolfman, an alien, a zombie and the bride of Frankenstein among those present at), "Hey Boy" (a ballad that has the girls take it in turns to sing about their feelings and reservations regarding a boy), the somewhat oriental-sounding "I Love Your Sushi" (in which Daphne and Celeste are praised by a man rapping in Japanese) and a disco song called "Star Club".

Daphne revealed that the inspiration for the album was “fun”.

It reached #4 in New Zealand and #140 in the UK.

Track listing
 "Roll Call" – 3:41
 "Ooh Stick You" – 3:31
 "I Love Your Sushi" – 3:59
 "Peek-a-Boo" – 4:22
 "Spy Girl" – 3:24
 "Never Been to Memphis" – 3:13
 "School's Out" – 3:23
 "Star Club" – 3:27
 "U.G.L.Y." – 3:46
 "Hey Boy" – 4:47

Japan bonus tracks:
 "Ooh Stick You (Twelve Inch Stick)" – 4:24
 "U.G.L.Y. (Uglier Mix)" – 4:52
 "U.G.L.Y. (Tom Boy Mix)" – 6:30

References

2000 debut albums
MCA Records albums
Daphne and Celeste albums